Cytokine is a monthly peer-reviewed academic journal covering the study of cytokines as they relate to multiple disciplines, including molecular biology, immunology, and genetics. It was established in 1989 and is published by Elsevier. It is the official journal of the International Cytokine & Interferon Society. The editor-in-chief is Dhan Kalvakolanu (University of Maryland School of Medicine). According to the Journal Citation Reports, the journal has a 2016 impact factor of 3.488 .

References

External links

Elsevier academic journals
Immunology journals
Publications established in 1989
Monthly journals
Biochemistry journals
English-language journals
Academic journals associated with international learned and professional societies